WCMT may refer to:

Radio station call signs
 WCMT (AM), a radio station (1410 AM) licensed to Martin, Tennessee, United States
 WCMT-FM, a radio station (101.3 FM) licensed to South Fulton, Tennessee

Organisations
 Winston Churchill Memorial Trusts